Celebrity is a 1928 American silent comedy film directed by Tay Garnett and starring Robert Armstrong, Clyde Cook and Lina Basquette.

The film's sets were designed by the art director Mitchell Leisen.

Cast
 Robert Armstrong as Kid Reagan 
 Clyde Cook as Circus 
 Lina Basquette as Jane 
 Dot Farley as Mother 
 Jack Perry as Cyclone 
 Otto Lederer as Cyclone's Manager 
 David Tearle as Reporter

References

Bibliography
 Munden, Kenneth White. The American Film Institute Catalog of Motion Pictures Produced in the United States, Part 1. University of California Press, 1997.

External links
 

1928 films
1928 comedy films
1920s English-language films
American silent feature films
Silent American comedy films
Films directed by Tay Garnett
American black-and-white films
Pathé Exchange films
1920s American films